Vila Jacuí is a district in the subprefecture of São Miguel Paulista in the city of São Paulo, Brazil. 

Districts of São Paulo